Tokai, a large residential suburb of Cape Town, South Africa, is situated on the foothills of the Constantiaberg, (a large whaleback shaped mountain in the Table Mountain range) and is bordered by Steenberg and Kirstenhof to the south, Bergvliet to the east, Constantia to the north and the SAFCOL pine tree plantations against the mountain to the west.

History
In 1791 or 1792, governor Johan Isaac Rhenius bestowed the area of Tokai to Johannes Rauk, a colonist originally born in Narva, Estonia, who became one of the first farmers in the Dutch Cape Colony.

Tokai, named after Tokaj, a range of hills in Hungary, was originally an open area with various wine farms and smallholdings. Today, though most of the wine farms are no longer there, there are still a few old Cape Dutch houses like those found in Constantia. The suburb was built in the late 1940s, and was built quickly because of the urgent need for housing for predominantly white, English-speaking South African soldiers returning from World War II.

Scenery and surroundings
Nearby is Pollsmoor Prison, where Nelson Mandela and other political prisoners were incarcerated by the Apartheid regime. Mandela was there for four years (1984 to 1988) after his transfer from Robben Island, before moving on to Victor Verster Prison until his release on 11 February 1990. 

Some of Tokai's roads are paved with red brick. Streams run through Tokai and the pine plantations, forming green belts where various bird, frog, and insect species make their home. These green belts also provide areas for recreation including walking, cycling and dog walking. The once extensive pine plantations were, until recently, regarded as a prime spot to observe predatory birds, including hawks, buzzards, owls and certain eagle species. 

Some of the last tiny remnants of Cape Flats Sand Fynbos can be found around here (although even these remnants have been partially covered with pine plantations). This is the only spot in the entire world where this endangered vegetation type survives in a sustainably large area, and work is under way to provide it with long-term protection.

In 2018, the Norval Art Foundation was opened close to Steenberg Wine Estate. The Foundation houses unique art works from the collection of the Norval family.

See also
Tokai Arboretum

References

Suburbs of Cape Town